{{Speciesbox
| image = Pomacentrus labiosus Day 81.jpg
| parent_authority = M.C.W. Weber, 1913<ref name = CoF>{{cof record|genid=8855|title=Cheiloprion|access-date=6 October 2018}}</ref>
| taxon = Cheiloprion labiatus
| display_parents = 3
| authority = (Day, 1877)
| synonyms = Pomacentrus labiatus Day, 1877  
}}
The big-lip damselfish is a species of ray-finned fish from the family Pomacentridae, it is the only species in the monotypic genus Cheiloprion''. It occurs in the eastern Indian Ocean and south western Pacific Ocean and has been recorded from Sri Lanka east to the Solomon Islands, north to the Philippines, south to Vanuatu as well as northern Australia, from Shark Bay in Western Australia to Palm Island, Queensland. and Palau.

References

Pomacentrinae
Big-lip damselfish